BBC Japan was a television channel from the BBC available via satellite in Japan. Similar in format to BBC Prime (now BBC Entertainment), BBC Japan showed such BBC programmes as Blackadder and Fawlty Towers, with many of them subtitled in Japanese.

The channel launched on 1 December 2004 and was available on Sky PerfecTV! satellite channel 110 and Online TV Company's IPTV service, but ceased broadcasting less than two years later.

Closure
On 20 March 2006, the BBC announced that its distributor JMC "no longer has the financial means to honour its contractual commitments to distribute the BBC Japan channel". On 24 April 2006, the BBC confirmed that BBC Japan would cease broadcasting on 30 April 2006.

References

International BBC television channels
Defunct BBC television channels
Television channels and stations established in 2004
Television channels and stations disestablished in 2006
2004 establishments in Japan
2006 disestablishments in Japan